Trithemis is a genus of dragonflies in the family Libellulidae. They are commonly known as dropwings. There are over 40 species, mainly from Africa; two are endemic to Madagascar, and five can be found in Asia. They are found in a wide variety of habitats; some species being adapted to permanent streams in forests, and others being capable of breeding in temporary pools in deserts.

Species
The genus contains the following species:

References

 
Taxa named by Friedrich Moritz Brauer
Anisoptera genera
Taxonomy articles created by Polbot